Tamrookum is a rural locality in the Scenic Rim Region, Queensland, Australia.

Geography 

The Mount Lindesay Highway traverses Tamrookum from north (Laravale) to south (Innisplain) and forms part of the north-west boundary. The Logan River forms its eastern boundary.

In the east adjacent to the river the predominant land use is irrigated cropping and irrigated pasture for grazing. In the west the principal land use is grazing on native vegetation.

History 

The name Tamrookum is believed to be a corruption of the Aboriginal words  (from the Yugumbeh language) dhan/buragun meaning place of boomerangs.

The first Tamrookum squatter was John Campbell and the lessee from 1848 was William Barker.

Pastoralist John Collins of Mundoolun acquired the land in 1878 and in 1879 his eldest son Robert Martin Collins took up residence after his marriage to Arabella Smyth. RM Collins became the owner in 1886.

RM Collins and his brothers established vast pastoral interests in Queensland and the Northern Territory. He was a founding partner in the North Australian Pastoral Company and a pioneer of the frozen meat industry. He was a parliamentarian from 1896 to 1913 and was responsible for the establishment of Lamington National Park, proclaimed in 1915 after his death.

Following the death of RM Collins in 1913, his family constructed an Anglican church in his memory (Collins had chosen the site prior to his death). All Saint's Memorial Church was dedicated on 31 August 1915 by Archbishop St Clair Donaldson.

Tamrookum State School opened on 31 January 1939.

In October 1944, a meeting of local residents decided to construct memorial hall. However, the project took some years and the Tamrookum Memorial Hall finally opened on 5 April 1952.

Heritage listings 

Tamrookum has a number of heritage-listed sites, including:
 Tamrookum Church Road: All Saints Memorial Church

Education 
Tamrookum State School is a government primary (Prep-6) school for boys and girls at 9019 Mount Lindesay Highway. In 2017, the school had an enrolment of 141 students with 15 teachers (8 full-time equivalent) and 12 non-teaching staff (7 full-time equivalent). There is no secondary school in Tamrookum; the nearest is Beaudesert State High School in Beaudesert.

Amentities 
Tamrookum has a roadhouse and general store, located on the eastern side of the Mount Lindsay Highway.

Anglican services are held once a month at All Saints Memorial Church at Tamrookum Church Road.

Tamrookum Memorial Hall is on the corner of the Mount Lindesday Highway and Tamrookrum Church Road.

References

External links 

Scenic Rim Region
Localities in Queensland